Amitesh Shukla (born 12 September 1957) is an Indian National Congress politician from Chhattisgarh, India. He served as Minister of Rural Development in the Government of Chhattisgarh in 2000–2003.

He is the incumbent member of the Chhattisgarh Legislative Assembly from Rajim, having been elected in 2018. He was elected to the same seat in 1999 (bypoll) and 2008 previously.

Personal life
Amitesh Shukla was born on 12 September 1957 in Gariaband. His father Shyama Charan Shukla was an Indian National Congress politician and served thrice as Chief Minister of Madhya Pradesh.

His grandfather Ravishankar Shukla was a lawyer, an INC politician from Central Provinces and Berar and the first Chief Minister of Madhya Pradesh.  His uncle Vidya Charan Shukla, was also an INC politician, a union minister, and a nine-time Member of Parliament in the Lok Sabha.

References

1958 births
Indian National Congress politicians
Chhattisgarh MLAs 2000–2003
Chhattisgarh MLAs 2008–2013
Living people
State cabinet ministers of Chhattisgarh
Chhattisgarh MLAs 2018–2023